Norway has participated in 54 Miss World pageants since the pageant's inception in 1951.  No Norwegian has won the title, although one was first runner-up in 1972.

History
One of the two winners at the Miss Norway Pageant would compete at the Miss World. When the candidate does not qualify (due to age), another woman is sent. Norway sent its first Miss World representative to the third Miss World pageant in 1953. Norway has never won Miss World. Its best placement belongs to Ingeborg Sørensen, first runner-up to Miss World 1972.

Titleholders
Color key

References

External links
Froken Norge

 
Lists of Norwegian women
Recurring events established in 2011
Norway
Norwegian awards
Nations at beauty pageants